Baliński (feminine: Balińska) or Balinski is a Polish-language surname. Notable people with the surname include:

 Ella Balinska (born 1996), British actress
 Damian Baliński (born 1977), Polish motorcycle speedway rider
 Damian Baliński jr (born 1989), Polish speedway rider
 (born 1943), Polish actress
  (1827-1902), Polish/Russian psychiatrist
 (1794-1864), Polish-Lithuanian historian and publicist 
 Michel Balinski (born 1933), Swiss-born Polish American and French mathematician
 Stanisław Baliński (1889-1984), Polish poet, writer and diplomat

See also
 

Polish-language surnames